Megalopalpus angulosus, the Grünberg's harvester, is a butterfly in the family Lycaenidae. It is found in Nigeria (the Cross River loop), Cameroon, Equatorial Guinea and the Democratic Republic of the Congo (the western part of the country and Kasai). The habitat consists of forests.

References

Butterflies described in 1910
Miletinae